Chamseddine Rahmani (born 15 September 1990) is an Algerian footballer who plays for CS Constantine and the Algeria national team.

Club career
In January 2016, Rahmani extended his contract with MO Béjaïa for another 2 years.

On 28 May 2019, Rahmani joined Saudi Pro League club Damaac. He signed a one-year contract with the option to extend for a further year. After making 12 appearances for the club, his contract was ended six months early on 4 January 2020. On 5 January 2020, Rahmani returned to Algeria and joined former club CS Constantine.

International career
On 29 September 2016 Rahmani received his first ever call-up to the Algeria national football team for a 2018 FIFA World Cup qualifier against Cameroon.

References

External links
 

1990 births
2017 Africa Cup of Nations players
Algeria international footballers
Algerian expatriate footballers
Algerian Ligue Professionnelle 1 players
Algerian Ligue 2 players
Saudi Professional League players
Algerian footballers
CS Constantine players
MO Béjaïa players
USM Annaba players
Hamra Annaba players
Damac FC players
Living people
People from Annaba
Association football goalkeepers
Expatriate footballers in Saudi Arabia
Algerian expatriate sportspeople in Saudi Arabia
21st-century Algerian people
2022 African Nations Championship players
Algeria A' international footballers